2019 Belarusian First League is the 29th season of 2nd level football in Belarus. It started in April and ended in November 2019.

Team changes from 2018 season
Two best teams of 2018 Belarusian First League (Slavia Mozyr and Energetik-BGU Minsk) were promoted to Belarusian Premier League. They were replaced by two lowest placed teams of 2018 Belarusian Premier League table (Smolevichi and Dnepr Mogilev).

Last placed team of the last season (Chist) relegated to the Second League. They were replaced by two best teams of 2018 Second League (Rukh Brest and Krumkachy Minsk), and the league was expanded to 16 teams.

Krumkachy Minsk were renamed to NFK Minsk during the winter break. In spring 2019, Dnepr Mogilev merged with Premier League team Luch Minsk, citing the willingness keep the city of Mogilev represented in top flight. The united club was named Dnyapro Mogilev. As a result, Dnepr Mogilev vacated their First League spot, and Sputnik Rechitsa (Second League 3rd-placed team) was additionally promoted.

A few days before the start of the season, UAS Zhitkovichi were denied a First League license due to debts and withdrew to the Second League, leaving the tournament one team short.

Teams summary

League table

Results

Top goalscorers

Updated to games played on 24 November 2019 Source: football.by

See also
2019 Belarusian Premier League
2018–19 Belarusian Cup
2019–20 Belarusian Cup

References

External links
 Official site 

Belarusian First League seasons
2
Belarus
Belarus